Effertz is a German surname. Notable people with the surname include:

Horst Effertz (born 1938), German rower
Josef Effertz (1907–1984), German politician
Otto Effertz (1856–1921), German economist

German-language surnames